Rășinari is a commune in Sibiu County, Transylvania, Romania. It has a population of 5,280 inhabitants (2011 census) and is composed of two villages, Prislop (Priszloptelep) and Rășinari.

Until 2012, Rășinari was connected to Sibiu by a roughly 8-km tram line through the Dumbrava Forest, but regular service ended in 2011 and since 2013 much of the line has since been dismantled.

History
In the second half of the 18th century, the Rășinari Orthodox bishops' residence was built - the first one of its kind in Transylvania. Today the pastoral traditions of the village are incorporated in the new modern rhythm of life.

Tram line

From 1947, Rășinari was linked to Sibiu by an electric tram line which crossed Dumbrava Forest, but service became sporadic in the late 2000s and ceased entirely on 28 February 2011. Very limited operation that took place later – mainly only for visiting tourist groups – ended in 2012, followed in 2013 by the start of work to dismantle the line.  It is hoped to reopen a portion as a heritage tramway. The trams in use since the mid-1990s were formerly used in Geneva and retained their French-language signs. In 2013, they were sold to Rășinari for a low price and moved to the Rășinari end of the tram line, just before work to remove the tracks and overhead trolley wires began.  Officials in Răşinari are attempting to obtain funding to build a small depot (carhouse) and to reopen a portion of the line as a tourist attraction.

In 2018, the tram line between Rășinari and Dumbrava Zoo was reopened for visitors' use.

Demographics
The 1930 Census registered 5281 inhabitants, of which 5229 were Romanian, 32 Gypsies, 13 Germans, 4 Hungarians. At the 2002 Census, the same percentages were maintained, with 5529 inhabitants registered.

Prislop

Prislop village has around 300 residents (as of 2010), of whom about 15 are ethnic Romanians and the rest Roma. However, at the 2002 census, the latter declared as Romanians, as they speak Romanian and not Romani. This caused the village to miss out on the opportunity to apply for European Union funds for Roma integration. There is one school from kindergarten to 4th grade; pupils who finish can go on through 8th grade in Răşinari.

Sights
 Andrei Șaguna monument
 "St. Parascheva" Church
 Octavian Goga memorial house
 The ruins of the medieval fortress of Cetățuia Citadel
 Ethnographic Museum
 Ward Museum (set up in the former residence of the bishops)

Natives
 Daniil Popovici-Barcianu (1847–1903), teacher, naturalist, and political activist
  (1814–1879), priest, corresponding member of the Romanian Academy
 Traian Bratu (1875–1940), scholar of German language and literature
  (1850–1912), agronomist and politician
 Emil Cioran (1911–1995), philosopher and essayist
 Octavian Goga (1881–1938), poet, playwright, and politician 
  (1882–1977), lieutenant general and Defense Minister
  (1842–1904), military doctor and explorer
  (1876–1956), engineer and Mayor of Timișoara

References

Communes in Sibiu County
Localities in Transylvania